Senator Waddington may refer to:

James Waddington (1831–1917), Wisconsin State Senate
John A. Waddington (1911–1981), New Jersey State Senate